
Elsinore High School is a public high school located in Wildomar, California. It was founded in 1891 and is one of the oldest schools in Riverside County. The campus is visible from the Interstate 15 freeway.

The school is a California Distinguished School, an AVID National Demonstration School, and a Riverside County High School Model of Excellence for their Special Education and Peer Counseling programs.

Student body
The student body includes 500–600 students in each grade or class:

Freshman: 601
Sophomore: 638
Junior: 582
Senior: 503

Clubs
Active clubs at the school include academic decathlon, ASB, AVID, cheerleading, dance, drama, Model United Nations, Relay For Life, and Solar Cup.

Sports
The school engages in a large number of sports including baseball, basketball, cheerleading, cross country running, football, golf, soccer, softball, swimming, tennis, track and field, volleyball, water polo, and wrestling.

Notable alumni 
 Dane De La Rosa, Professional baseball player
 Alisa M. Kimble, Miss California USA 1997, Miss Lake Elsinore 1988
 Kodi Lee, America's Got Talent Winner and 1st Golden Buzzer, 2019
 Mackee M. Mason, Principal, Austin Achieve Public Schools
 Ryan Ochoa, Disney actor, singer
 Daniel Stange, former Arizona Diamondbacks and Los Angeles Angels of Anaheim pitcher

References 

High schools in California
Public high schools in California
1891 establishments in California